Ilercavonia is an ancient comarca of Spain formerly populated by the ancient Iberian tribe known as Ilercavones. It is a greater comarca made up of smaller ones. The ties between the people of the region transcend ancient kingdom and later provincial borders.

History
The name 'Ilercavonia' to refer to the territory occupied by the Ilercavones Iberian tribe appears in ancient Greek and Roman texts and documents. The northern limits of this territory were in Serra de la Llena, the northeastern in Coll de Balaguer, the western in Mequinensa and the southern in the area of a river mentioned as 'Oduba' in Roman documents, which could be either the Millars River, or another river further south along the coast closer to Sagunt. This geographical zone corresponds roughly to the present-day Maestrat/Maestrazgo, Matarraña/Matarranya and Terres de l'Ebre comarcas.

During the Middle Ages the territory of Ilercavonia found itself located at the confluence of the kingdoms of Valencia, Catalonia and Aragon. Since that time, and until the mid-20th century, the Diocese of Tortosa would give a certain basic recognition to the people of this ancient region who, despite having had no historic political representation of their own, share common geographic, economic, cultural and linguistic ties. The traditional Aragonese parishes of the Diocese of Tortosa, however, were segregated during General Franco's dictatorship, following the Concordat of 1953 between the Francoist regime and the Vatican.

Besides the lack of recognition and effective representation, this greater comarca has suffered much from a lack of development and investment since the mid-20th century, when the only railway line connecting the region with Aragon, the RENFE line from Tortosa to Alcañiz and Zaragoza, was terminated in 1973. This line was dismantled as a result of a 1962 World Bank report advising the Spanish State to concentrate investment in the great lines and to abandon the less profitable railways connecting rural areas. The bulk of the development in eastern and northeastern Spain was henceforward diverted to the cities of Barcelona and Valencia in detriment of this region.

Nowadays the name Ilercavonia is used mainly in academic and scientific circles, as well as in cultural events.

See also
Ilercavones
Roman Catholic Diocese of Tortosa
Maestrat
Taula del Sénia
Lower Aragon

References

Bibliography
María del Mar Llorens Forcada, María del Mar Llorens & Xavier Aquilué, Ilercavonia-Dertosa i les seves encunyacions monetàries, Institut d'Estudis Catalans. Societat Catalana d'Estudis Numismàtics, 
Teofil Pitarch i Vives, Fraternitas Saecularis: Vallibona/Pena-roja de Tastavins, Diputació de Castelló. 2005,

External links 
Historia de la línea de La Puebla de Híjar-Alcañiz-Tortosa-Sant Carles de la Ràpita
Yale University Library, publications about Ilercavonia

Historical regions in Spain
Natural regions of Spain